KHUD (92.9 FM) is a country radio station in Tucson, Arizona. The radio studios and offices are located north of downtown Tucson along Oracle Road. On weekdays, KHUD carries two nationally syndicated country music shows from co-owned Premiere Networks:  The Bobby Bones Show in morning drive time and CMT Nites with Cody Alan, heard overnight.

KHUD has an effective radiated power (ERP) of 93,000 watts. The transmitter site is in the Tucson Mountains, west of the city. KHUD broadcasts using HD Radio technology. KHUD's HD2 digital subchannel served as the originating station of the iHeart80s channel on iHeartRadio. As of August 13, 2021, the simulcast of iHeart80s has ceased and moved to Syracuse, NY sister property WYYY's HD2 slot. It is currently unknown what KHUD is broadcasting on its HD2 subchannel.

History

Rock (1969-1983)
Alvin Korngold, owner of KEVT 690 (now KCEE) was granted the construction permit for an FM station in Tucson at 92.9 on August 6, 1969. The new station was assigned the KWFM call sign in October and it signed on the air in March 1970, with full 24-hour programs starting on April 1.

KWFM had a progressive rock format in its early years, which over time shifted to mainstream rock.

Oldies (1983-2001) 
In 1983, KWFM began broadcasting an oldies format known as "Cool FM."

Country (2001-2003)
On April 2, 2001, KWFM and its oldies music moved to the 97.1 frequency (and eventually to AM). A new country music station, KOYT "92.9 Coyote Country", launched on 92.9.

Adult alternative (20030-2011)

KOYT flipped to adult album alternative (AAA) on December 5, 2003, becoming KWMT-FM on January 22, 2004. KWMT-FM focused on music from the AAA charts. Several rock artists recorded live performances to play on the station. There was a segment titled Chill Side of The Mountain every night from 11pm-1am which included ambient and underground music such as AIR, Hooverphonic, Lamb, The Polyphonic Spree, Radiohead, Massive Attack, Morcheeba and Zero7. Acoustic Sunrise and Acoustic Sunset, from 7am-noon and 8-11pm respectively, offered a "unique blend of acoustic sounds", with a wide range of artists. A few times a month, the station held a small listener attended artist session and meet-and-greet called Studio C.

Hot adult contemporary (2011-2021)
In the late 2000s, KOYT became a hot AC station after adding non-AAA artists, but it kept "The Mountain" branding. It was also added to the Mediabase & BDS hot AC panels.

On November 18, 2011, at 5pm, after playing "It's the End of the World as We Know It (And I Feel Fine)" by R.E.M., the station was relaunched. The format was Hot Adult Contemporary, calling itself "My 92.9", with the first song being "Moves like Jagger" by Maroon 5 featuring Christina Aguilera. On November 28, 2011, KWMT-FM changed the call letters to KMIY.

In July 2013, the wake-up show, Valentine in the Morning, was replaced with Detroit syndicated show Mojo In The Morning, which formerly aired on sister station KOHT. Mojo was later replaced by a local morning show, Cyndi & Chris, on November 2, 2015. KMIY modified its music mix in December 2017 to incorporate more 1980s and 1990s hits into its playlist, repositioning as "Variety from the 80s, 90s, and Today."

Country (2021-present)
On January 6, 2021, at 9:29 a.m., after playing Christmas music until January 4, the station began stunting with songs containing "America" in the title until January 5, TV theme songs until January 6, and then a loop of "Baby Shark." KMIY would flip back to Country music as "92.9 The Bull", launching with 10,000 songs in a row. The first song on "The Bull" was "My Kinda Party" by Jason Aldean.

The change was part of a format swap with sister station KYWD. The call letters were changed to KHUD on March 29, 2021, with the KMIY call letters moving to the 97.1 frequency.

See also
List of radio stations in Arizona

References

External links
92.9 The Bull live streaming audio

FCC History Cards for KHUD

HUD
Country radio stations in the United States
Radio stations established in 1970
IHeartMedia radio stations
1970 establishments in Arizona